Peter Buck (born 1956) is an American musician, best known as the guitarist of R.E.M.

Peter Buck may also refer to:

People
 Te Rangi Hīroa (1877–1951), also known as Sir Peter Buck, New Zealand Maori leader and academic
 Peter Buck (restaurateur) (1930–2021), American physicist, restaurateur, and philanthropist, co-founder of Subway Sandwiches
 Peter Buck (mayor) (died 1625), mayor of Medway

Music
 Peter Buck (album), a 2012 album by the musician